The Frightened Man is a 1952 British crime film directed by John Gilling and starring Dermot Walsh, Barbara Murray and Charles Victor. It is also known by the alternative title of Rosselli and Son and was shot at Twickenham and Riverside Studios. Its plot concerns a son of an antiques dealer who suffers a dramatic fall from grace.

Plot
Antiques dealer Roselli's dreams for his son Julius are disappointed when the young man is sent down from Oxford University for bad behaviour. Julius then gets involved with a gang of Camden Town jewel thieves. When they attempt to rob a warehouse Julius is injured in the getaway, but he continues his involvement and formulates a plan to steal diamonds from his wife’s employer in Hatton Garden. The gang leader agrees, but intends to cut out Roselli snr who, unknown to Julius is a partner in the gang.

Cast
 Dermot Walsh as Julius Roselli 
 Barbara Murray as Amanda 
 Charles Victor as Mr Roselli 
 John Blythe as Maxie 
 Michael Ward as Cornelius Hart 
 Thora Hird as Vera 
 John Horsley as Harry Armstrong 
 Annette D. Simmonds as Marcella 
 Martin Benson as Alec Stone 
 Ballard Berkeley as Inspector Bligh 
 Peter Bayliss as Bilton 
 Thomas Gallagher as Matthews

Critical reception
TV Guide wrote: "this decent crime drama was written and directed by John Gilling, known for his efficient low-budget adventures and thrillers." 
Britmovie calls the film a "decent if unremarkable second-feature crime drama featuring Irish actor Dermot Walsh...Walsh's father is played by experienced character actor Charles Victor, who performs his role with quiet, self-effacing distinction."
The film historians Steve Chibnall and Brian McFarlane note that "the film won considerable praise for being authentically staged, effectively directed, 'thrilling and human'.".

References

External links

1952 films
British crime films
1952 crime films
Films directed by John Gilling
British black-and-white films
Films shot at Twickenham Film Studios
Films shot at Riverside Studios
Films set in London
1950s English-language films
1950s British films